Nagas may refer to the following:

Ken Nagas, Australian rugby league footballer
Naga people, the modern Sino-Tibetan ethnic group.
Nāga, serpent deities in Indian mythology
Naga Rajputs, a caste of India
Nagas of Padmavati, a dynasty of ancient India
Nagas of Vidisha, a dynasty of ancient India
Naga Kingdom, a legendary kingdom of Mahabharata
Naga people (Sri Lanka), snake worshippers mentioned in ancient Sri Lankan chronicles

See also
 Naga (disambiguation)